Aviation Heritage Museum can refer to any of several museums including:

Alaska Aviation Heritage Museum
Aviation Heritage Museum (Western Australia)
Western New Mexico Aviation Heritage Museum